Love Theme from "Romeo and Juliet" (A Time for Us) is an album by American pop singer Johnny Mathis that was released on July 30, 1969, by Columbia Records. Of its 11 tracks, eight had been hits for other performers earlier that year, and one of the remaining three, "I'll Never Fall in Love Again", would become a huge success for Dionne Warwick several months later.

The Mathis recording of "I'll Never Fall in Love Again" made its first appearance on Billboard magazine's list of the 40 most popular Easy Listening songs in the US in the issue dated May 17, 1969, and peaked at number 35 during its three weeks there. The title track from the album debuted on that same chart two months later, in the July 5 issue, and got as high as number eight over the course of 13 weeks. It also had a three-week run on the Billboard Hot 100 that began in the July 26 issue and took it to number 96. The first of the album's 24 consecutive weekly appearances on the magazine's  Top LP's chart came two months later, in the September 20 issue, and led to a number 52 showing.

Love Theme from "Romeo and Juliet" (A Time for Us) was released for the first time on compact disc on June 9, 2009, as one of two albums on one CD, the other LP being the previous studio effort by Mathis, Those Were the Days.

Reception

Billboard wrote, "Mathis is in top form in this latest LP outing as he offers his own special interpretations of some of today's biggest hits."

Track listing

Side one
"Love Theme from "Romeo and Juliet" (A Time for Us)" from Romeo and Juliet (Larry Kusik, Nino Rota, Eddie Snyder) – 2:58 
"Aquarius/Let the Sunshine In" from Hair (Galt MacDermot, Gerome Ragni) – 3:04
"Without Her" (Harry Nilsson) – 3:01 
"I'll Never Fall in Love Again" from Promises, Promises (Burt Bacharach, Hal David) – 3:02
"Live for Life" from Live for Life (Norman Gimbel, Francis Lai) – 2:59 
"We" from Me, Natalie (Henry Mancini, Rod McKuen) – 3:03

Side two
"Didn't We" (Jimmy Webb) – 2:49
"Love Me Tonight" (Barry Mason, Daniele Pace, Mario Panzeri, Lorenzo Pilat) – 2:58
"The Windmills of Your Mind" from The Thomas Crown Affair (Alan and Marilyn Bergman, Michel Legrand) – 3:33 
"The World I Threw Away" (Harry Greenfield, Neil Sedaka) – 3:18
"Yesterday When I Was Young" (Charles Aznavour, Herbert Kretzmer) – 2:55

2017 CD bonus tracks
This album's CD release as part of the 2017 box set The Voice of Romance: The Columbia Original Album Collection included a bonus track that was previously unavailable:
"The Way of Love" (Jacques Dieval, Al Stillman) – 2:51

Recording dates
From the liner notes for The Voice of Romance: The Columbia Original Album Collection:
January 18, 1969 – "I'll Never Fall in Love Again"
June 5, 1969 – "Love Theme from "Romeo and Juliet" (A Time for Us)", "The World I Threw Away"
June 10, 1969 – "Aquarius/Let the Sunshine In", "Didn't We", "Love Me Tonight", "Without Her"
June 13, 1969 – "Live for Life", "We", "The Windmills of Your Mind", "Yesterday When I Was Young"

Personnel
Johnny Mathis – vocals
Jack Gold – producer (except as noted)
Ernie Freeman – arranger and conductor (except as noted)
Robert Mersey – producer and arranger ("I'll Never Fall in Love Again")
Phil Macy – engineer
Ivan Nagy – photography

References

Bibliography

 

1969 albums
Johnny Mathis albums
Columbia Records albums
Albums arranged by Ernie Freeman
Albums conducted by Ernie Freeman